Bhoga Khidikee is a 2018 Indian Assamese drama film directed by Jahnu Barua. It was the opening film of 2nd Guwahati International Film Festival. The film is based on the real life experiences of a village girl in upper Assam and is set against the socio-political landscape of the state in 2015.

Plot
The film revolves around Togor, a young woman married secretly to a militant Konseng who breaks her window to enter her room at night without her parents being aware of it.

Cast
Zerifa Wahid
Seema Biswas
Bishnu Kharghoria 
Kasvi Sharma

References

External links
 

Indian drama films
Films directed by Jahnu Barua
2010s Assamese-language films
2018 drama films